Łambinowice  is a village in Nysa County, Opole Voivodeship, in south-western Poland. It is the seat of the gmina (administrative district) called Gmina Łambinowice.

Łambinowice was the location of Camp Lamsdorf which served as a prisoner of war camp during the Franco-Prussian war of 1870, and First as well as Second World Wars. When the area became Polish, the camp was maintained as Camp Łambinowice and served as a forced labour and resettlement camp for Germans.

Village

First mentioned under the name of Lambinowicz in 1273, the town shared the fate of the Upper Silesia and the land of Opole throughout the ages. Much damaged by the wars of the 17th century, most notably the Thirty Years' War, it lost much of its meaning as a centre of commerce and was reduced to but a small village.

Camp

German Empire
In 1864, a large military training ground was established around the village. During the Franco-Prussian War, a prisoner of war camp for French soldiers was located on the grounds of the training camp. In it more than 3000 men were incarcerated, 53 of them perished and are buried at the local cemetery. The camp was reactivated during World War I, when the Germans  set up one of the largest camps for prisoners of war, housing roughly 90,000 internees, mostly from the United Kingdom, Russia, Italy and Serbia. Due to poor housing conditions roughly 7000 men died in captivity.

Nazi Germany
Closed down following the Treaty of Versailles, the camp was reopened on 3 September 1939, immediately after the outbreak of the Polish Defensive War. The infamous Stalag VIII-B camp housed roughly 100,000 Polish prisoners. After the outbreak of the Soviet-German conflict some of the Poles were transferred to other places of detention while thousands of Soviet prisoners were amassed in tragic conditions in a separate camp named Stalag VIII-F. 

Altogether, throughout the World War II more than 300,000 Allied and Soviet prisoners passed through the gates of the camp at Lamsdorf, between 40,000 and 100,000 of them died. Most of those who perished are buried in mass graves in the nearby village of Klucznik and at the local cemetery.

In October 1944, soldiers and officers were brought here from the Warsaw Rising, including over 1,000 women. Later, most of them were transferred to other camps.

Poland
After the Soviet takeover of the area, on 17 March 1945 the Red Army took the camp over and continued to operate it, this time the institution housed German prisoners of war.

A transit camp, run by the Ministry of Internal Security and commanded by Czesław Gęborski (later put on trial for crimes against humanity for his actions in the camp), was also created nearby, serving as an internment, labor and resettlement camp for German Silesians, as a "verification" point for Silesians, as well as a camp for former veterans of the Anders' Polish II Corps, whom the new communist authorities of Poland saw as dangerous. Out of 8,000 internees, it is estimated that between 1,000 and 1,500 German civilians died in the camp, mostly by typhus and maltreatment. More than 1,130 names are listed in the cemetery.

Memorial
Currently the memory of the inmates is preserved by a large monument devoted to all the victims of the camp, as well as the Central Prisoner of War Museum, the only such institution in Poland and one of very few in the world.

See also
 Grabin, Opole Voivodeship
 Stalag VIII-B
 Prisoner-of-war camps
 List of concentration and internment camps

References

External links
 Official webpage
 Prisoner of war museum
 Lamsdorf Remembered
 Jewish Community in Łambinowice on Virtual Shtetl

Villages in Nysa County
World War II prisoner of war camps